The Italian painter and engraver Bernardino Mei (1612/15 –  1676) worked in a Baroque manner in his native Siena and in Rome, finding patronage above all in the Chigi family.

Briefly a pupil of the Sienese cartographer and draughtsman Giuliano Periccioli, where he learned the art of engraving, Bernardino passed to the studio of the painter Rutilio Manetti and probably also served in the workshop of Francesco Rustici.

He painted in and around Siena, where his work came to the attention of Cardinal Fabio Chigi, who, once elected pope as Alexander VII (1655), called Bernardino Mei to Rome in 1657. There Bernardino came under the influences of Mattia Preti, Andrea Sacchi and Pier Francesco Mola, and of Guercino, to the extent that until the 20th century Bernardino's fresco of Aurora in Palazzo Bianchi Bandinelli was attributed to Guercino himself. Through the fast friendship that bonded him to Gian Lorenzo Bernini, whose studio he frequented, he applied that sculptor's sense of theatrical action to his own mythological and allegorical subjects. He died in Rome in 1676.
 
In the 19th century, Bernardino was dismissed as a tame follower of greater lights, but his painting was re-evalued in the later 20th century, expressed in the exhibition Bernardino Mei e la pittura barocca a Siena, Siena, 1987.

Notes

Italian Baroque painters
Painters from Siena
1676 deaths
Year of birth unknown
Year of birth uncertain